Você é D+ is the fifth album by the Brazilian music duo Sandy & Junior. It was produced by their father, notable Brazilian singer Xororó, from the duo Chitãozinho & Xororó. It was released by PolyGram in 1995. The singer and presenter Xuxa participated singing in the first song of the album, "Rap do Aniversário".

As in many early Sandy & Junior albums, many songs were versions of international songs recorded in Portuguese, like "Sonho Real", which is a version of "(I've Had) The Time of My Life", from the movie Dirty Dancing (1987). The title song itself is a version of "Love so Right", from Bee Gees. Also, "Hopelessly Devoted To You", was sang originally by Olivia Newton-John, and "Doce como Mel", was originally "Sugar Baby Love", by The Rubettes.

The Song "O Universo Precisa de Vocês (Power Rangers)" was one of the most successful in the album, paying a homage to the first seasons of the series Power Rangers, which was a big success in Brazil at the time. Another hit was "Vai Ter Que Rebolar",, the only song from the album that carried on being sung by the duo into their adult years.

Track listing

References

External links 
 Você é D+ at Discogs

Sandy & Junior albums
1995 albums
Children's music albums by Brazilian artists
Portuguese-language albums